John Edward Sheridan (September 15, 1902 – November 12, 1987) was a Democratic member of the U.S. House of Representatives from Pennsylvania.

John E. Sheridan was born in Waterbury, Connecticut, the son of Irish immigrants.  He graduated from the University of Pennsylvania at Philadelphia, PA, in 1925 and from the law department of Temple University in Philadelphia in 1931.  He served as deputy attorney general of Pennsylvania from 1934 to 1937.  He was a member of the Board of Revision of Taxes of Philadelphia County in 1937 and the Pennsylvania counsel for the Delaware River Bridge Commission in 1938 and 1939.  He was a delegate to the Democratic National Conventions in 1932, 1936, 1940, and 1944.

Sheridan was elected as a Democrat to the 76th Congress to fill the vacancy caused by the death of J. Burrwood Daly and was re-elected to the Seventy-seventh, Seventy-eighth, and Seventy-ninth Congresses.  He was not a candidate for reelection in 1946.  After his time in Congress, he served in the United States Air Force from 1954 to 1962, retiring as a colonel.  He was a member of the County Board of Law Examiners from 1954 to 1965, and consul general for the Principality de Monaco in Philadelphia.  He is buried in Arlington National Cemetery.

References
 Retrieved on 2008-02-10

External links

1902 births
1987 deaths
American people of Irish descent
University of Pennsylvania alumni
Burials at Arlington National Cemetery
Politicians from Waterbury, Connecticut
Temple University Beasley School of Law alumni
Democratic Party members of the United States House of Representatives from Pennsylvania
20th-century American politicians